Raheja Developers Limited, (RDL), formerly Raheja Developers Private Limited, is an Indian real estate development company with its headquarters in Delhi, India.

RDL was incorporated in 1990 by Navin Raheja, and is currently managed by its chairman and Managing Director Nayan Raheja.

History 
Raheja Developers Limited was incorporated by Navin Raheja in 1990. The group has worked with contractors such as Aedas, Shapoorji-Pallonji and two of its joint-development projects were in collaboration with Tata Group. It had also collaborated with Dubai-based Arabtec Construction.

In 2008, Raheja Developers planned to build a Special Enterprise Zone (SEZ) in Gurgaon at an estimated cost of $660M US.  The development was to be on a  site, but the project did not advance. The Government of India announced denotification of the SEZ project on 29 January 2014.

In 2020, Raheja Revanta, the tallest residential towers by Raheja Developers, was awarded the Luxury Project of the Year by CNN News 18 Real Estate Business Excellence Awards. The project is being built by Arabtec, the makers of Burj Khalifa, Dubai, but now a dispute has developed between Raheja Developers and Arabtec and the matter of contract-termination reached the Delhi High Court. IndianKanoon: Raheja Developers Ltd vs Arabtec Construction (India) on 14 May, 2020

Raheja Vanya, located in Gurugram, bagged the Green Project of the Year Award 2020.

Controversies 
In 2014 investigative portal Cobrapost conducted a sting operation against several real estate developers. It alleged that Raheja was one among the several developers willing to accept black money. Based on this, the Central Board of Direct Taxes ordered a probe into Raheja and 34 other developers.

In 2014, the Prime Minister of India's Office ordered a probe relating to alleged irregularities in a Gurgaon housing project named Raheja Atharva. Subsequently, the State Level Expert Appraisal Committee investigated, and 0.8 acres of the Atharva project was sealed as it was illegally constructed without any Environmental Clearances.

In October 2019, one of Raheja's projects were imposed with a heavy fine, for flouting pollution norms.

In July 2019, Raheja Developers faced insolvency proceedings under the Section 7 of Insolvency and Bankruptcy Code, 2016, on a complaint filed by home buyers on alleged delay in delivery of flats. On enquiry, the NCLAT bench observed that the home buyers had filed the application with intent of refund of money. 

The NCLAT reserved its order in the case in September 2019, further removing the Interim Resolution Professional (IRP) in January 2020, thus allowing the board of directors to take back control of the company.

References 

Real estate companies of India
Indian companies established in 1990
Privately held companies of India